Norman Gibbs (born June 29, 1960) is a former American football quarterback who played three seasons in the Canadian Football League with the Winnipeg Blue Bombers and Toronto Argonauts. He played college football at Southern University.

References

External links
Just Sports Stats
Fanbase profile

Living people
1960 births
Players of American football from Baton Rouge, Louisiana
American football quarterbacks
Canadian football quarterbacks
American players of Canadian football
Southern Jaguars football players
Winnipeg Blue Bombers players
Toronto Argonauts players